The 2002 Tour du Haut Var was the 34th edition of the Tour du Haut Var cycle race and was held on 23 February 2002. The race started and finished in Draguignan. The race was won by Laurent Jalabert.

General classification

References

2002
2002 in road cycling
2002 in French sport
February 2002 sports events in France